Your Witness may refer to:

 Your Witness (film), a 1950 British crime film directed by and starring Robert Montgomery 
 Your Witness (TV series), an American television series